Menifee is a town in Conway County, Arkansas, United States. The population was 302 at the 2010 census.

Geography
Menifee is located in southeastern Conway County at  (35.148602, -92.553318). U.S. Route 64 passes through the center of the town, leading southeast  to Conway and west  to Morrilton, the Conway County seat. Interstate 40 serves the town with one exit.

Demographics

2020 census

As of the 2020 United States census, there were 274 people, 45 households, and 30 families residing in the town.

2000 census
As of the census of 2000, there were 311 people, 116 households, and 83 families residing in the town.  The population density was 54.3/km (141.0/mi2).  There were 141 housing units at an average density of 24.6/km (63.9/mi2).  The racial makeup of the town was 11.90% White, 84.57% Black or African American, and 3.54% from two or more races.  1.93% of the population were Hispanic or Latino of any race.

There were 116 households, out of which 34.5% had children under the age of 18 living with them, 44.8% were married couples living together, 19.0% had a female householder with no husband present, and 28.4% were non-families. 26.7% of all households were made up of individuals, and 19.0% had someone living alone who was 65 years of age or older.  The average household size was 2.68 and the average family size was 3.20.

In the town, the population was spread out, with 28.9% under the age of 18, 9.0% from 18 to 24, 25.1% from 25 to 44, 19.6% from 45 to 64, and 17.4% who were 65 years of age or older.  The median age was 37 years. For every 100 females, there were 85.1 males.  For every 100 females age 18 and over, there were 82.6 males.

The median income for a household in the town was $27,500, and the median income for a family was $34,750. Males had a median income of $27,500 versus $20,859 for females. The per capita income for the town was $12,624.  About 8.6% of families and 10.8% of the population were below the poverty line, including 11.0% of those under age 18 and 14.5% of those age 65 or over.

References

Towns in Conway County, Arkansas
Towns in Arkansas